Die Strandclique is a German television series.

See also
Gegen den Wind (1994 – 1997)
List of German television series

External links
 

1999 German television series debuts
2002 German television series endings
German television spin-offs
German-language television shows
Das Erste original programming